Lakshman 'Sam'  Samaranayake is a Sri Lankan clinical academic with expertise in diagnostic clinical microbiology and research, senior executive level administration, and dental pedagogy and is best known for his work with Candidiasis. After serving as a Consultant Clinical Microbiologist in Glasgow, UK he joined the academia. Since then, working in five different trans-continental universities, he has authored  over 450 scientific communications, cited over 27,000 occasions (h-index 90)).  Subsequently, he served over 12 years as the Executive Dean of two major dental schools in Hong Kong (a top five ranking dental school globally), and Australia at the University of Hong Kong and University of Queensland, respectively. He has received numerous accolades for his contributions to dentistry, including the King James IV Professorship of the Royal College of Surgeons of Edinburgh, UK, and the Distinguished Scientist Award of IADR, USA. He holds many visiting/honorary professor appointments in the universities of Thailand, Australia, Indonesia, the UK, the Middle East, and China.

Education 

Samaranayake was born in Sri Lanka and attended the Royal College, Sri Lanka for his secondary education. He then earned his Bachelor of Dental Sciences (BDS) degree from the University of Peradeniya, Sri Lanka, and received his Doctoral Degree (DDS),  at the University of Glasgow, UK  through research into oral candidal infections,   where he served as a Consultant/ Senior Lecturer in Oral Medicine and Pathology; simultaneously he was an honorary consultant in microbiology to the Greater Glasgow Health Board, Scotland (1985-1990). He obtained his training in medical and oral microbiology, at the Glasgow Royal Infirmary, for the Fellowship of the Royal College of Pathologists, UK under Professor Morag Timbury. Subsequently, he became a member, and then a fellow of the college, by examination in clinical microbiology. He was the first dentist from South East Asia to do so, and the fourth, internationally to gain such recognition.
Then he served as an associate professor at the University of Alberta, Canada (1990-1991), and Reader /Professor University of Hong Kong(1991-2013), University of Queensland, Australia (2014-2016), Kuwait University (2017-2018) and as a Visiting Professor at Sharjah University, UAE through invitation (2018-2020). Currently, he is a Professor Emeritus at the University of Hong Kong and an honorary professor at the Universities of Thailand, Indonesia, Oman, China, and Sri Lanka.

Academic and research career 
With an h index of 90 derived from over 480 scientific communications, and cited in the literature on more than 27,000 occasions he is amongst the top 2% of global scientist, and considered as the foremost, global authority on oral fungal diseases and related human mycoses. Additionally, he is amongst the top ten most cited scholars in the discipline of Dentistry.

Publications

Notable books

Awards and achievements 
He is the first Sri Lankan and the Asian to awarded the King James IV Professorship of the Royal College of Surgeons of Edinburgh for exceptionally outstanding research in dental surgical sciences (conferred in 2013).
He has received numerous awards and honors as follows:

References

External links 
 

Living people
Sri Lankan scientists
Academic staff of the University of Hong Kong
Academic staff of the University of Queensland
Year of birth missing (living people)
Sri Lankan dentists
Alumni of the University of Glasgow
Alumni of the University of Peradeniya
Sri Lankan academics
Sri Lankan medical researchers
Sri Lankan academic administrators